Amanda Christine Laddish (born May 13, 1992) is an American retired soccer player.

Early life
Laddish was raised in Lee's Summit, Missouri, where she attended Lee's Summit High School where she played for the varsity soccer team. In 2009, she was named a Parade All-American, ESPN/RISE second-team All-American, and all-state selection. She was an NSCAA youth/high school all-region selection in 2008 and 2009.

In February 2010, Laddish was ranked 26th for club soccer players across the United States by Top Drawer Soccer.  In addition to playing and captaining club team Blue Valley Stars, she played for regional Olympic Development Program (ODP) teams.

Notre Dame Fighting Irish
Laddish attended the University of Notre Dame from 2010 to 2013 where she received a bachelor's degree in marketing. During her freshman season in 2010, Laddish started all 25 matches helping the team win its third national championship. She was one of 26 players in the school's history to start every game of their freshman season. Laddish is also well known for her pregame salsa dancing.

Club career

FC Kansas City 2014–2017
Laddish was selected by FC Kansas City during the 2014 NWSL College Draft in January 2014. She made her first appearance for the club during a match against the Boston Breakers in which Kansas City defeated Boston 2–0. Kansas City finished the regular season in second place and advanced to the playoffs where they eventually won the championship after defeating the Seattle Reign 2–1. Laddish signed a new contract with FC Kansas City after the 2016 season. She underwent hip surgery in 2016 and was expected to play in 2017, but she was placed on the season ending injury list (SEI) and never played in 2017.

Utah Royals FC 2018–2019
After FC Kansas City ceased operations, Laddish was added to the roster of the Utah Royals FC. On April 8, Laddish announced that she would undergo a second hip surgery, and would miss the entire NWSL season for the second straight year. Laddish signed a new contract with the Royals prior to the 2019 NWSL season. On April 20, 2019 she appeared in her first game with the Royals, this was her first appearance on the field since September 12, 2016, with FC Kansas City.

Laddish retired from professional soccer in February 2020.

International career
Laddish has appeared with the United States national U-20 soccer team, and was a member of the championship team at the 2012 FIFA U-20 Women's World Cup.

Honors

Club 
FC Kansas City
Winner
 National Women's Soccer League Championship (2): 2014, 2015

International 
United States U-20
Winner
 FIFA U-20 Women's World Cup: 2012
 CONCACAF Women's U-20 Championship: 2012

See also

 2012 FIFA U-20 Women's World Cup squads
 2012 CONCACAF Under-20 Women's Championship squads
 2008 FIFA U-17 Women's World Cup squads

References

External links 
 
 U.S. Soccer player profile
 FC Kansas City player profile
 
 Profile at soccerdonna.de 

1992 births
Living people
American women's soccer players
FC Kansas City draft picks
FC Kansas City players
National Women's Soccer League players
Notre Dame Fighting Irish women's soccer players
Parade High School All-Americans (girls' soccer)
People from Lee's Summit, Missouri
Soccer players from Missouri
Sportspeople from the Kansas City metropolitan area
United States women's under-20 international soccer players
Utah Royals FC players
Women's association football midfielders